Pedro Cornet (born 29 April 1946) is a Paraguayan fencer. He competed in the individual foil event at the 1988 Summer Olympics.

References

External links
 

1946 births
Living people
Paraguayan male foil fencers
Olympic fencers of Paraguay
Fencers at the 1988 Summer Olympics
20th-century Paraguayan people